Garry Jacobson (born 28 February 1992 in Shepparton, Australia) is an Australian motor racing driver. He previously competed in the Supercars Championship, driving the No. 76 Holden ZB Commodore for PremiAir Racing. Jacobson won the 2016 Supercars Dunlop Series with Prodrive Racing Australia in a Ford FG X Falcon.

Jacobson entered the Supercars Championship full time in 2019, with Kelly Racing.
Jacobson's best finish that season would be a 12th place at Surfers Paradise. He ended up finishing 23rd in the standings that season.

In 2020, Jacobson defected to Matt Stone Racing. His best finish that season would be a 7th place at Sydney Motorsport Park. He improved slightly, finishing 21st in the points by the end of the season.

In 2022, Jacobson was sacked from PremiAir Racing.

Career results

Complete Development Series results

(key) (Races in bold indicate pole position) (Races in italics indicate fastest lap)

Supercars Championship results

Bathurst 1000 results

References

External links
 Garry Jacobson V8 Supercars Official Profile
Driver Database profile
Profile on Racing Reference

Australian racing drivers
1992 births
Living people
Supercars Championship drivers
Nismo drivers
Kelly Racing drivers
Matt Stone Racing drivers